Wiswell is a civil parish in Ribble Valley, Lancashire, England.  It contains seven listed buildings that are recorded in the National Heritage List for England.  Of these, one is listed at Grade I, the highest of the three grades, and the others are at Grade II, the lowest grade.  The parish contains the small village of Wiswell, and is otherwise rural.  The listed buildings consist of houses, farmhouses, a barn, and a medieval wayside cross.

Key

Buildings

Notes and references

Notes

Citations

Sources

Lists of listed buildings in Lancashire
Buildings and structures in Ribble Valley